Vincenzo Michetti (1878 in Pesaro – 1956 in Pesaro) was an Italian composer.

Works

Operas

 Maria di Magdala, dramma lirico in 3 acts (episodes), libretto by the composer, Rome, Teatro Costanzi, 5 March 1918
 La grazia, dramma pastorale in 3 acts, libretto by Claudio Guastalla after Grazia Deledda, Rome, Teatro Costanzi, 31 March 1923 The first performance obtained a good success.
 La Maddalena, opera in 3 acts, libretto by the composer, Milan, Teatro alla Scala, 22 November 1928 La Maddalena was a revision of Maria di Magdala with a different plot and many updates in the music. The reception was not fully satisfactory, due to persistent musical imperfections.

Other
Michetti was also the author of songs and music for piano.

References

20th-century classical composers
Italian classical composers
Italian male classical composers
Italian opera composers
Male opera composers
People from Pesaro
1878 births
1956 deaths
20th-century Italian composers
20th-century Italian male musicians